KASLIWAL hail from KASLI, a village in Sikar district, (Rajasthan). Notable people with the name 'KASLIWAL' include
SHANKARLALJI SURAJMALJI KASLIWAL BORN ON 18-07-1898(FOUNDER OF S.KUMARS GROUP) , CHANDRAWATIJI SHANKARLALJI KASLIWAL (COFOUNDER OF S.KUMARS GROUP) BORN ON 11 NOVEMBER 1925,WORLDGURU SKUMARSSHRI ALOKKUMAR KASLIWAL BORN ON 08-05-1960 (OWNER) OF S.KUMARS GROUP, ANUPAMA ALOKKUMAR KASLIWAL, ABHIMANYU ALOKKUMAR KASLIWAL, AASTHA ALOKKUMAR KASLIWAL, ALL BELONGING TO JAIN DIGAMBAR TERA PANKTI GOTRA KHANDELWAL 

 Asha Kasliwal, British Indian doctor
 Munnu Kasliwal (born 1958), Indian jewelry maker
 Narendra Mohan Kasliwal (1928–2021), Indian Supreme Court justice
 Nemi Chandra Kasliwal (1909-1978), Indian politician
 Sir Seth Hukamchand Kasliwal (1874–1959), Indian freedom fighter
 Vidhi Kasliwal, Indian film director and producer
 Kushagra Kasliwal, (born1999), Consultant, GEP ; MBA KJ Somaiya Institute of Management
 Pankaj Kasliwal, Metal Artist, Professional metal swings and furniture designer, Indore
 Ruthvij Kasliwal, Fitness enthusiast and bodybuilder
 Ritu Kasliwal, Msc PhD Zoology

Indian surnames
Toponymic surnames
Surnames of Indian origin
Surnames of Hindustani origin
People from Sikar district
Indian Jains
Jain communities
Bania communities